Gibela is a joint French–South African railway rolling stock manufacturer.  It is majority owned by Alstom, which controls 70% of the company and African companies Ubumbano Rail has 30% stakes.

Gibela was announced as the preferred bidder for a R51 billion contract to build 3,600 electric multiple units for the Passenger Rail Agency of South Africa in December 2012, which was finalized in October 2013. Under the terms of the contract, Gibela would construct the units over a ten-year period, as well as provide parts and technical support after delivery. While the first twenty EMUs, dubbed the X'Trapolis Mega, were built by Alstom in Brazil, Gibela began construction of a new R1 billion assembly facility in Dunnottar, South Africa in March 2016 to construct the remaining 580 trainsets. Gibela began occupying the facility in early January 2018, with construction scheduled to be completed in March. In addition to building vehicles for South African operators, Gibela also plans to compete for other African rail contracts.

References

Rolling stock manufacturers of South Africa
Alstom